Firestorm is a science fiction novel by American writers David Sherman and Dan Cragg.  It is set in the 25th Century in Sherman and Cragg's StarFist saga.  "Firestorm more concludes the Ravenette campaign for the 34th fist and the Force Recon (introduced in Backshot, and expands in Recoil, two books of a three book sub series).

Reception
Publishers Weekly in their review said "readers looking for accounts of futuristic combat that depict realistically the psychology of men in battle need look no further."  Roland Green reviewing for Booklist said "more of the usual good stuff for
military sf buffs from two master depicters of grunts at war, which Sherman and Cragg themselves once were."

References

American science fiction novels
2007 American novels
StarFist series
2007 science fiction novels
Military science fiction novels
Novels set in the 25th century
Del Rey books